State Route 212 (SR 212) is a  route that serves as a connection between SR 14 and SR 111 in Wetumpka in Elmore County.

Route description
The western terminus of SR 212 is located at its intersection with SR 14 west of downtown Wetumpka. From this point, the route travels in an easterly direction towards downtown where it terminates at SR 111. Through the city, this is also signed as West Bridge Street.

Major intersections

References

212
Transportation in Elmore County, Alabama